Britta Persson is a Swedish indie pop musician from Uppsala, Sweden, who in September 2010 is releasing her third album entitled “Current Affair Medium Rare”.  She has gone from making modest and very simple recordings to working with complex arrangements but always with the same straight to the point lyrics and a feeling in the melodies as if they were just meant to be.
Britta Persson had her breakthrough in her native Sweden in 2006 with the album “Top Quality Bones and a Little Terrorist”. The single Winter Tour got high rotation on radio in Scandinavia and a couple of years later also got great recognition in Europe thanks to a TV advertising campaign. 
2008 the follow-up album “Kill Hollywood Me” was released. It clearly showed a tendency and followed the direction towards a bigger sound and a greater production. Since the start Britta Persson has worked with artists such as Kristofer Åström and Camera Obscura.

In 2012 Persson helped co-write the song So Young So High by Swedish Duo Dada Life.

Discography

Studio albums

|}

EPs
2004: Demo 1
2004: Demo 2
2005: Found At Home

References

External links
Official webpage

Swedish women singers
Swedish songwriters
Living people
Year of birth missing (living people)